Haji Mala Saeed (1866–1937) was a Kurdistan politician who represented Sulaimaniyah City. He was a member of parliament, and was appointed as Minister of Justice in the Kurdistan Kingdom.

References
Family tree for Old Sulayamaniya Families between 1784–1914, First Edition 2008 Author Abdulkhalid Sabir (Ref 2708-Kurdish)

Iraqi Kurdistani politicians
1937 deaths
1866 births